The Clifton Hotel is a small, late Victorian hotel in Scarborough, North Yorkshire, England. 
The hotel stands on the North Bay cliff tops and was home to soldiers on home duty during both the First World War and Second World War. The location of the building offers commanding views of the North Sea.

During the First World War, the hotel was known as the Clarence Gardens Hotel and was home to Wilfred Owen, soldier and war poet, who wrote many of his early war poems while on service and the single occupant of the tower room. A heritage trail blue plaque marks the site today. The hotel is a short distance from Saint Mary's Church and the grave of Anne Brontë.

References

External links 
Clifton Hotel Scarborough website

Hotels in Scarborough, North Yorkshire
Heritage hotels